Dillon Douglas (born 17 September 1998) is a West Indian cricketer. He made his List A debut on 23 November 2019, for the Windward Islands in the 2019–20 Regional Super50 tournament.

References

External links
 

1998 births
Living people
Saint Vincent and the Grenadines cricketers
Windward Islands cricketers
Place of birth missing (living people)